Kishore Kumar Junior (KKJ, released 2018) is a Bengali drama film directed by Kaushik Ganguly, starring Prosenjit Chatterjee, and Aparajita Auddy in lead roles. The film was a sleeper hit.

Plot

This film is about a singer who sings only those songs sung by the legendary Indian singer Kishore Kumar. The title of Kishore Kumar Junior (KKJ) was bestowed by the famous singer himself. KKJ lives in Kolkata with his wife and son, and his band musicians are like his second family. KKJ, his wife, and band is invited to perform in a Government initiative, for some border villages in the state of Rajasthan. However, upon reaching Rajasthan, they are abducted by a group of Pakistanis, whose intentions are not clear.

It is now up to KKJ to save his wife and band members.

Most of the songs in the movie are performed by Kumar Sanu.

Cast
 Prosenjit Chatterjee as Rajat Ghosh aka Kishore Kumar Junior
 Aparajita Auddy as Rita Ghosh (Wife of KKJ)
 Rwitobroto Mukherjee as Rishi (Son of KKJ)
 Rajesh Sharma as Firoz
 Masood Akhtar as Taufiq
 Lama Halder as Khokon
 Kaushik Ganguly as Himself in a special appearance
 Mir Afsar Ali as Himself in a special appearance
 Kumar Sanu as Himself in a special appearance
 Rajat Ganguly as Suranjan Moitra,Central Minister

Soundtrack

Release 
The film released in India on 12 October 2018, just before Durga Puja.

References

External links
 

Bengali-language Indian films
2010s Bengali-language films
Films directed by Kaushik Ganguly
2018 films
Indian musical drama films
Jukebox musical films
Films scored by R. D. Burman
Films scored by Indradeep Dasgupta
Films scored by Kishore Kumar
Films scored by Shankar–Jaikishan
Films scored by Hemant Kumar
Films scored by Shyamal Mitra